The 1927 Memorial Cup final was the ninth junior ice hockey championship of the Canadian Amateur Hockey Association. The George Richardson Memorial Trophy champions Owen Sound Greys of the Ontario Hockey Association in Eastern Canada competed against the Abbott Cup champions Port Arthur West Ends of the Thunder Bay Junior Hockey League in Western Canada. The series was the first to feature two Ontario-based teams. Teams from Port Arthur and Fort William (later amalgamated into Thunder Bay), competed with geographically closer western teams, rather than eastern teams.

In a best-of-three series, held at the Arena Gardens in Toronto, Ontario, Owen Sound won their 2nd Memorial Cup, defeating Port Arthur 2 games to none.

Scores
Game 1: Owen Sound 5-4 Port Arthur
Game 2: Owen Sound 5-3 Port Arthur (OT)

Winning roster
Red Beattie, Benny Grant, John Grant, Martin Lauder, Jack Markle, Shrimp McDougall, Alvin Moore, Paddy Paddon, H. Smith.  Coach: Bill Hancock and Father J. Spratt

References

External links
 Memorial Cup
 Canadian Hockey League

1926–27 in Canadian ice hockey
Memorial Cup tournaments
Ice hockey competitions in Toronto
1920s in Toronto
1927 in Ontario